Chen Shanshan (born November 21, 1983) is a Chinese classical guitarist.  Some sources give her birth year as 1982.

Chen Shanshan has studied with Chen Zhi and toured internationally.

She has also performed in a quartet formation (Four Angels) with Wang Yameng, Li Jie, Su Meng.

Discography
La Catedral  2000 (Beijing Global Audio-Visual Publishing House 環球音像) (altern.)
Guitar Concert in Korea by Four Angels Quartet, 2006 (Alma Guitar)

Video
Guitar Concert in Korea by Four Angels Quartet, 2006 (Alma Guitar)

External links
Biography (www.almaguitar.com)
Biography (www.zhguitar.com)

1983 births
Living people
Chinese classical guitarists
People's Republic of China musicians
Place of birth missing (living people)
Women classical guitarists
21st-century guitarists
21st-century women guitarists